Alejandro Neciosup Acuña (born December 12, 1944), known professionally as Alex Acuña, is a Peruvian-American drummer and percussionist.

Background
Born in Pativilca, Peru, Acuña played in local bands such as La Orquesta de los Hermanos Neciosup from the age of ten. Acuña then followed his brothers and moved to Lima as a teenager. At the age of eighteen he joined the band of Perez Prado, and in 1965 he moved to San Juan, Puerto Rico. In 1974 Acuña moved to Las Vegas, working with artists such as Elvis Presley, The Temptations, and Diana Ross, and the following year he joined the jazz-fusion group Weather Report, appearing on the albums Black Market and Heavy Weather. While in New York City, Acuña recorded several songs under RCA records. Acuña decided to leave because of the genre limitations placed on him, in which RCA records only had him play Latin music.

Acuña left Weather Report in 1978, and became a session musician in California, recording and playing live with (amongst many others) Paul McCartney, Joni Mitchell, Ella Fitzgerald, Elvis Presley, Michael Jackson, Chick Corea, Whitney Houston, Plácido Domingo, former Weather Report bandmates Wayne Shorter and Joe Zawinul, Herbie Hancock, Carlos Santana, Antonio Carlos Jobim, Beck, Roberta Flack, U2, Al Jarreau and Marcos Witt. He appears on recordings by musicians as culturally diverse as Lee Ritenour, Johnny Clegg, Roy Orbison, YellowJackets, Lalo Schifrin, Milton Nascimento, Don Grusin, Dave Grusin, The Brecker Brothers, Arturo Sandoval, Vladislav Sendecki, Paquito d'Rivera, Gonzalo Rubalcaba, Brad Mehldau, BoDeans, Paco de Lucia, John Patitucci, Sadao Watanabe, Lyle Mays, Diana Ross, Sérgio Mendes, Robbie Robertson, Jackson Browne, Bette Midler, Jennifer Nettles, Christina Aguilera, Seal and Chris Botti.

In the 1980s Acuña also recorded and toured with the Christian jazz band Koinonia, which featured session musicians Abraham Laboriel, Justo Almario, Hadley Hockensmith, Harlan Rogers, and Bill Maxwell. The Winans, Andraé Crouch, Madonna, He played on Willy DeVille's Crow Jane Alley album and in 1987 he teamed up with Elvis Presley's TCB Band for the Roy Orbison TV special "A Black and White Night". He played percussion on Blondie's number one hit "The Tide Is High" and also recorded more than 300 movies under the direction of Lalo Schifrin, Dave Grusin, Michel Legrand, Bill Conti, James Horner, James Newton Howard, John Williams, Alan Silvestri, Michael Giacchino, Christopher Beck, Maurice Jarre, Steve Jablonsky, John Powell and Heitor Pereira. In 1987, Acuña was summoned back to Perú by producer Ricardo Ghibellini to be the musical producer of Los Hijos del Sol, a supergroup of Peruvian prodigies designed to promote Peruvian music worldwide. Acuña remains dedicated to promoting the musical culture of his homeland with the group, blending traditional and modern sounds.

He has also worked as an educator at University of California, Los Angeles, and Berklee College of Music. LAMA, Musicians Institute, USC, CSUN.

Appears On 
 (1964) Lights! Action! Prado - Perez Prado - Drums
 (1975) Live in Berlin 1975 - Weather Report - Percussion
 (1976) Moonshadows - Alphonso Johnson - Percussion
 (1976) Montreux Jazz Festival 1976 - Weather Report - Composer
 (1976) Black Market - Weather Report
 (1977) Heavy Weather - Weather Report
 (1977) Ecue Ritmos Cubanos - Louie Bellson - Percussion
 (1977) Don Juan's Reckless Daughter - Joni Mitchell - Percussion
 (1977) Birds of Passage - Sadao Watanabe - Percussion
 (1977) Captain Fingers - Lee Ritenour - Percussion
 (1977) Arabesque - John Klemmer - Percussion
 (1978) Time and Chance - Caldera - Percussion
 (1978) The Captain's Journey - Lee Ritenour - Drums, Percussion
 (1978) Smokin''' - Frankie Ortega - Drums
 (1978) Black Forest - Luis Conte - Drums
 (1979) Friendship - Lee Ritenour - Drums, Timbales
 (1979) Rio - Lee Ritenour - Drums
 (1979) Feel The Night - Lee Ritenour - Congas, Timbales, Percussion
 (1979) Dreamer - Caldera - Percussion
 (1979) Nightingale - Gilberto Gil - Drums, Percussion
 (1979) No One Home - Lalo Schifrin - Drums
 (1979) Minnie - Minnie Riperton - Drums
 (1979) Live at the Public Theater - Heath Brothers - Percussion
 (1979) Brazilia - John Klemmer - Percusion
 (1979) Bottom Line - John Mayall - Percussion
 (1980) The Builder - Michael Omartian - Conductor
 (1980) The Best of John Klemmer, Vol. 1: Mosaic - John Klemmer - Percussion
 (1980) Masterless Samurai - Osamu Kitajima - Drums
 (1980) Salsa Picante - Clare Fischer - Timbales, Latin Percussion
 (1980) Only Love Can Sustain - Luis Alberto Spinetta - Servicios varios
 (1980) Odori - Hiroshima - Guest Artist
 (1980) Look In Your Heart - Ernie Watts - Percussion
 (1980) In Harmony - Sesame Street - Drums
 (1980) Gaviota - Poncho Sanchez - Guest Artist
 (1980) Autoamerican - Blondie - Percussion
 (1981) 2+2 - Clare Fischer - Timbales, Percussion
 (1981) Machaca - Clare Fischer - Tambora, drums, timbales, percussion and bongos
 (1981) Ella Abraça Jobim - Ella Fitzgerald - Drums
 (1981) Rit - Lee Ritenour - Drums
 (1982) Rit 2 - Lee Ritenour - Drums
 (1982) Hollywood - Maynard Ferguson - Percussion
 (1982) Heartlight - Neil Diamond - Drums
 (1982) Secrets of the Andes - Victor Feldman - Drums, Percussion
 (1982) The House of Love - Maria Muldaur - Percussion
 (1982) Touchstone - Chick Corea - Cymbals, Drums, Percussion
 (1983) The Prodigious Piano of Bobby Enriquez - Bobby Enriquez - Drums, Percussion
 (1983) Friends - Larry Carlton - Percussion
 (1983) Don Grusin - Don Grusin - Drums, Percussion
 (1983) Not a Through Street - Johnny Rivers - Drums, Percussion
 (1983) Live at Concerts by the Sea, Vol. 1 - Bobby Enriquez - Drums
 (1984) Live at Concerts by the Sea, Vol. 2 - Bobby Enriquez - Drums
 (1984) How Will the Wolf Survive? - Los Lobos - Percussion
 (1984) Blues & Other Happy Moments - Barone Brothers - Percussion
 (1984) Another Time, Another Place - Dan Siegel - Percussion
 (1985) On The Edge - Dan Siegel - Percussion
 (1985) Musician - Ernie Watts - Drums
 (1985) Sólo Faltas Tú - Ilan Chester - Percussion
 (1985) Forever Friends - Justo Almario - Flute, Pan Flute, Drums, Percussion, Programming
 (1985) Dog Eat Dog - Joni Mitchell - Bata
 (1985) Atlantis - Wayne Shorter - Drums
 (1985) Harlequin - Dave Grusin, Lee Ritenour - Percussion 
 (1986) Short Stories - Dan Siegel - Percussion
 (1986) Lyle Mays - Lyle Mays - Drums, Percussion
 (1986) Sanctuary - Ernie Watts - Sax Tenor, Drums, Percussion
 (1986) New Day - Brian Bromberg - Drums, Percussion
 (1986) Daring Adventures - Richard Thompson - Percussion
 (1986) Last Nite - Larry Carlton - Percussion
 (1987) Yauaretê - Milton Nascimento - Drums
 (1987) Plumbline - Justo Almario - Vocals, Congas, Bata, Timbales, Drums
 (1987) All Systems Go - Donna Summer - Percussion
 (1987) Richard Marx - Richard Marx - Percussion
 (1987) Northern Nights - Dan Siegel - Percussion
 (1987) La Bamba (Original Motion Picture Soundtrack) - Percussion
 (1987) Walkin' on Air - Bobbysocks! - Percussion
 (1987) Portrait - Lee Ritenour - Percussion
 (1987) Weightless - John Chiodini - Percussion
 (1987) Four Corners - Yellowjackets - Percussion, Vocals
 (1987) By the Light of the Moon - Los Lobos - Percussion
 (1987) Recently - Joan Baez - Drums, Percussion
 (1987) The Turning - Sam Phillips - Percussion
 (1988) The Best of Ella Fitzgerald (Pablo) - Ella Fitzgerald - Drums
 (1988) Union - Toni Childs - Percussion
 (1988) Back of My Mind - Christopher Cross - Percussion
 (1988) The Indescribable Wow - Sam Phillips - Drums, Percussion
 (1988) Politics - Yellowjackets - Percussion
 (1988) Amnesia - Richard Thompson - Percussion
 (1988) The Immigrants - The Zawinul Syndicate - Drums, Percussion
 (1988) Concierto De Aranjuez - Lee Ritenour, Kazumi Watanabe, Kenji Omura - Drums
 (1988) Temple of Low Men - Crowded House - Percussion
 (1988) Rattle and Hum - U2 - Percussion
 (1988) La Pistola Y el Corazon - Los Lobos - Percussion
 (1989) The Spin - Yellowjackets - Percussion, Arrangements
 (1989) Tim Finn - Tim Finn - Percussion
 (1989) Kilowatt - Kazumi Watanabe - Percussion
 (1989) Maria McKee - Maria McKee - Percussion
 (1989) On The Corner - John Patitucci - Drums
 (1989) Cruel, Crazy Beautiful World - Savuka - Percussion
 (1989) Front Seat - Sadao Watanabe - Percussion
 (1989) World in Motion - Jackson Browne - Percussion
 (1990) The Neighborhood - Los Lobos - Drums, Shekere, Percussion
 (1990) Blue Pacific - Michael Franks - Percussion
 (1990) BASSically Speaking - Brian Bromberg - Drums, Percussion
 (1990) Niña - José Feliciano - Percussion
 (1991) Zephyr - Don Grusin - Drums, Congas, Cymbals, Hi-hat, Percussion
 (1991) Woodface - Crowded House - Percussion
 (1991) The Mambo Kings (1992 Original Soundtrack) - Tito Puente, Celia Cruz, Arturo Sandoval - Percussion
 (1991) Night Calls - Joe Cocker - Drums, Percussion
 (1991) Sereno - Wilkins - Drums, Percussion
 (1991) Oasis - Eric Marienthal - Percussion
 (1991) Heart of the Bass - John Patitucci - Percussion
 (1991) Going Home - Dan Siegel - Percussion
 (1991) Sweet Deal - Sadao Watanabe - Percussion
 (1991) Storyville - Robbie Robertson - Percussion
 (1991) Rumor and Sigh - Richard Thompson - Percussion
 (1991) Greenhouse - Yellowjackets - Percussion
 (1991) Collection - Lee Ritenour - Drums, Percussion
 (1991) Cruel Inventions - Sam Phillips - Drums, Percussion
 (1991) Night Ride Home - Joni Mitchell - Percussion
 (1992) No Borders - Don Grusin - Drums, Cajon, Congas, Bongos, Cymbals, Handclapping, Percussion
 (1992) Matters of the Heart - Tracy Chapman - Percussion
 (1992) King of Hearts - Roy Orbison - Drums, Percussion
 (1992) Life Is Messy - Rodney Crowell - Drums, Percussion
 (1992) Kiko - Los Lobos - Percussion
 (1992) Kid Gloves - Larry Carlton - Percussion
 (1992) Heritage - Justo Almario - Drums, Percussion, Cajon
 (1992) GRP All-Star Big Band - GRP All-Star Big Band - Percussion
 (1992) Drums & Percussion - Alex Acuña - Primary Artist
 (1992) Thinking of You - Alex Acuña and the Unknowns
 (1992) Through the Eyes of Love - Randy Crawford - Percussion
 (1992) Lift Him Up with Ron Kenoly - Ron Kenoly - Percussion
 (1992) Fat City - Shawn Colvin - Percussion 
 (1992) Worship with Don Moen - Don Moen - Percussion
 (1992) Out of the Cradle - Lindsey Buckingham - Percussion
 (1992) F-Zero Jazz Album - Percussion
 (1993) World of Contemporary Jazz Groups: GRP Gold Encore Series - Percussion
 (1993) Dear Friends - Abraham Laboriel, Larry Carlton - Drums
 (1993) Rejoice Africa - Lionel Peterson - Percussion
 (1993) River of Souls - Dan Fogelberg - Congas, Udu, Shaker, Triangle, Woodblock
 (1993) We Are One - Tom Inglis - Percussion
 (1993) Upfront - John Miles - Tambourine, Congas, Shaker, Bongos
 (1993) Tropical Heart - Oscar Castro-Neves - Drums, Percussion
 (1993) Traffic from Paradise - Rickie Lee Jones - Congas, Drums
 (1993) Dragonfly Summer - Michael Franks - Drums, Percussion
 (1993) The Gateway - Dan Siegel - Percussion
 (1993) One Touch - Eric Marienthal - Percussion
 (1993) Native Land - Don Grusin - Vocals, Drums, Congas, Cowbell, Tabla, Tambourine, Caxixi, Percussion
 (1993) Another World - John Patitucci - Percussion, Vocals (Background), Drums (African), African Drums
 (1994) Trust in the Lord - Live Worship with Don Moen - Don Moen - Drums and Percussion
 (1994) God Is Able - Ron Kenoly - Drums and Percussion
 (1994) As For My House - Rick and Cathy Riso - Percussion
 (1994) Simbolo de Amor - María Martha Serra Lima - Drums
 (1994) De mi Alma Latina - Placido Domingo - Percussion
 (1994) Falling Forward - Julia Fordham - Percussion
 (1995) Collection - Yellowjackets - Percussion, Composer, Primary Artist
 (1995) Sing Out with One Voice - Ron Kenoly - Percussion
 (1995) Mistura Fina - John Patitucci - Percussion
 (1995) No Resemblance Whatsoever - Dan Fogelberg, Tim Weisberg - Percussion
 (1995) What's Inside - Joan Armatrading - Percussion
 (1996) Antonio Carlos Jobim And Friends - Antonio Carlos Jobim - Percussion
 (1996) Wayruro - Jean Pierre Magnet - Drums, Percussion, Vocals
 (1996) This Is Jazz, Vol. 19 - Wayne Shorter - Drums
 (1996) This Is Jazz, Vol. 10 - Weather Report - Drums
 (1996) My People - Joe Zawinul - Percussion
 (1996) Misses - Joni Mitchell - Percussion, Bata
 (1996) Hits - Joni Mitchell - Percussion
 (1996) Cosas de la Vida - María Martha Serra Lima - Percussion
 (1996) Gillespiana - Lalo Schifrin - Latin Percussion
 (1997) Romances - Luis Miguel - Percussion
 (1997) You Know That Feeling - Brian Bromberg - Percussion, Sleigh Bells
 (1997) Audiophile - Victor Feldman - Drums, Percussion
 (1997) Taking Notes - Jeff Berlin - Percussion
 (1997) Under the Covers - Dwight Yoakam - Percussion
 (1997) Loving You - Shirley Horn - Percussion
 (1997) El Angel - Oscar Feldman - Drums
 (1998) This Is Jazz, Vol. 40: The Jaco Years - Weather Report - Drums
 (1998) Priceless Jazz - Yellowjackets - Percussion
 (1998) Jennifer Paige - Jennifer Paige - Percussion
 (1998) Human Being - Seal - Percussion
 (1998) Por Amor - Álvaro López Arista & Res-Q Band - Percussion
 (1999) Latin Jazz Suite - Lalo Schifrin - Percussion
 (1999) Timbre - Sophie B. Hawkins - Percussion
 (1999) Rabito - Sinceridad - Drums
 (2000) Acuarela de Tambores - Alex Acuña (Grammy nominee)
 (2000) Telling Stories - Tracy Chapman - Percussion
 (2001) The Well - Jennifer Warnes - Percussion
 (2002) Los Hijos del Sol: To My Country - Alex Acuña, Paquito D'Rivera, Wayne Shorter - Producer, Mixing, Drums, Percussion, Vocals, Cajon
 (2002) Live and Unreleased - Weather Report - Drums, Percussion, Composer
 (2002) Silver Living - Bonnie Raitt - Congas, Talkin Drum
 (2002) Faces & Places - Joe Zawinul - Main Personnel, Shaker, Percussion, Musician
 (2002) Escapology - Robbie Williams - Percussion
 (2003) Punk Jazz: The Jaco Pastorius Anthology - Jaco Pastorius - Drums
 (2003) The Evening of My Best Day - Rickie Lee Jones - Percussion
 (2003) Alegria - Wayne Shorter - Percussion
 (2004) Rediscovery On Grp: Chick Corea Family - Chick Corea - Drums, Percussion
 (2004) The Hang - Don Grusin - Drums, Percussion
 (2004) Deja Vu All Over Again - John Fogerty - Percussion
 (2005) No Accent - Alex Acuña - Primary Artist, Audio Production, Drums, Percussion
(2005) Never Gone - Backstreet Boys - Percussion
 (2005) And So Is Love - Rita Coolidge - Percussion
 (2006) Serenata Inkaterra - Jean Pierre Magnet - Percussion
 (2006) Live at Montreux Jazz Festival 1976 - Weather Report - Drums
 (2006) Brown Street - Joe Zawinul - Percussion
 (2006) Forecast: Tomorrow - Weather Report - Percussion
 (2006) Favorites: Sun Sea and Sand - Antonio Carlos Jobim - Percussion
 (2006) The Information - Beck - Percussion, Background vocals
 (2006) Tribute Concert - Antonio Carlos Jobim - Percussion
 (2006) All One - Oscar Castro-Neves - Main Personnel, Drums
(2006) Blood Diamond (Original Motion Picture Soundtrack) - Soloist
(2006) Happy Feet (Original Motion Picture Soundtrack) - Percussion
(2006) Full Circle - David Benoit - Guest Artist, Main Personnel, Percussion
 (2007) Tambolero - Jazz on the Latin Side All Stars - Member of Attributed Artist, Drums
 (2007) Lalo Schifrin and Friends - Lalo Schifrin - Additional Personnel, Performer
 (2007) In the Spirit of Jobim - Brian Bromberg - Featured Artist, Drums, Percussion
 (2007) Ultimate Jaco Pastorius - Jaco Pastorius - Percussion
 (2008) Romance in Rio - Stephen Bishop - Drums
 (2008) Amparo - Dave Grusin, Lee Ritenour - Drums, Percussion
 (2008) Change of Space - Patrick Moraz - Percussion
 (2008) Speak Low - Boz Scaggs - Drums, Percussion
 (2009) The Chick Corea Songbook - The Manhattan Transfer - Percussion
 (2009) IRM - Charlotte Gainsbourg - Percussion
 (2009) Shadows on the Moon - Johnny Rivers - Drums, Percussion
 (2009) It Is What It Is - Brian Bromberg - Congas, Percussion, String Section
 (2009) Jungle City - Alex Acuña - Primary Artist
 (2009) Serenata de los Andes en Vivo - Jean Pierre Magnet - Percussion
 (2010) Drum 'n' Voice Vol. 3 - Billy Cobham - Percussion
 (2010) The Imagine Project - Herbie Hancock - Percussion
 (2010) Vocabularies - Bobby McFerrin - Bongos, Percussion
 (2011) Soul 2 - Seal - Percussion
 (2011) Heritage  - Opeth - Percussion on 'Famine'
 (2012) ¡Ritmo!  – The Clare Fischer Latin Jazz Big Band (Directed by Brent Fischer) - Drums, Percussion
 (2012) Barxeta with Jan Gunnar Hoff and Per Mathisen
 (2012) Live & Extensions - The Manhattan Transfer - Percussion
 (2012) Compared to That - Brian Bromberg - Featured Artist, Percussion
(2012) Remember - Micky Dolenz - Bongos, Cajon, Percussion, Tambourine
(2012) Soul 2 - Seal - Percussion
(2012) The ESC Years - Joe Zawinul - Percus, Percussion, Shaker
(2013) Monsters University (Original Score) - Percussion
 (2013) The Voice of Jazz - Ella Fitzgerald - Drums
(2014) Dawn of the Planet of the Apes (Original Motion Picture Soundtrack) - Percussion
 (2014) That Girl - Jennifer Nettles - Percussion
 (2014) Love Has Many Faces: A Quartet, A Ballet, Waiting to Be Danced - Joni Mitchell - Bells, Percussion
 (2014) It's the Girls! - Bette Midler - Percussion
 (2015) Greatest Hits - Tracy Chapman - Percussion
 (2015) Jaco (Original Soundtrack) - Jaco Pastorius - Congas, Percussion
 (2016) Full Circle - Brian Bromberg - Congas, Percussion
 (2016) Sing (Original Motion Picture Soundtrack) - Percussion
 (2016) Surrender (with Victor Cajiao and Joe Cristina) - Drums and Percussion
(2017) Coco (Original Motion Picture Soundtrack) - Percussion
(2017) Moana: The Songs (Original Soundtrack) - Percussion
(2017) Star Wars: The Last Jedi (Original Motion Picture Soundtrack) - Percussion
(2018) Incredibles 2 (Original Motion Picture Soundtrack) - Percussion
 (2018) Straight Ahead George Kahn Trio CD w/Alex Acuna and Lyman Medeiros - drummer
 (2020) Dreamcatcher George Kahn w/ Pat Kelley, Alex Acuña, David Hughes
(2021) Spider-Man: No Way Home (Original Motion Picture Soundtrack)'' - Percussion

Equipment and instruments
Gon Bops Percussion:
 Alex Acuña Special Edition Congas
 Alex Acuña Signature Timbales
 Alex Acuña Special Edition Cajon
 Alex Acuña Signature Cajon
 Alex Acuña Special Edition Bongos
 Alex Acuña Bells

Acuña is known to have played drums, congas, bongos, timbales, bata, pandeiro, berimbau, cowbell, guiro, timpani, shaker, triangle, cowbell, cymbals, bombo, cajon, wood block, udu, tabla, caxixi, African drums, shekere, sleigh bells, snare drum, talking drum, bells, djembe, castanets, tamborim, and darbuka.

Awards 
 Best Latin/Brazilian Percussionist, Modern Drummer's Readers Poll.

References

External links 
 Alex Acuña at Drummerworld
 Alex Acuna, Jan Gunnar Hoff & Per Mathisen on DC LIVE!! at YouTube

1944 births
Living people
Peruvian expatriates in the United States
Afro-Cuban jazz drummers
Peruvian jazz drummers
Peruvian percussionists
Cuban jazz percussionists
Jazz percussionists
Batá drummers
Bombo legüero players
Bongo players
Castanets players
Conga players
Djembe players
Güiro players
Maracas players
Tabla players
Tambourine players
Timbaleros
Timpanists
Triangle players
Weather Report members
Alessa Records artists
Losen Records artists
GRP All-Star Big Band members
Koinonia (band) members